Bavayia geitaina, also known as the gracile bavayia, is a species of geckos endemic to southern Grande Terre in New Caledonia.

References

Bavayia
Reptiles described in 2000
Taxa named by Jennifer L. Wright
Taxa named by Aaron M. Bauer
Taxa named by Ross Allen Sadlier